A Hidden Life is a 2019 epic historical drama film written and directed by Terrence Malick. It stars August Diehl, Valerie Pachner, and Matthias Schoenaerts with Michael Nyqvist in his final performance. The film depicts the life of Franz Jägerstätter, an Austrian farmer and devout Catholic who refused to fight for the Nazis in World War II. The title is taken from George Eliot's Middlemarch:...for the growing good of the world is partly dependent on unhistoric acts; and that things are not so ill with you and me as they might have been, is half owing to the number who lived faithfully a hidden life, and rest in unvisited tombs.Eliot in turn derived it from a phrase in the New Testament, the Epistle to the Colossians 3:3: "For you died, and [now] your life is hidden with Christ in God."

The film premiered at the Cannes Film Festival in May 2019 and was theatrically released in the United States on December 13, 2019. It received critical acclaim upon release and was the final feature film to be released under the Fox Searchlight Pictures name before Walt Disney Studios changed the company's name to Searchlight Pictures on January 17, 2020.

Plot
Austrian peasant farmer Franz Jägerstätter, born and brought up in the small village of St. Radegund, is working his land when war breaks out. Married to Franziska, colloquially Fani, the couple are important members of the tight-knit rural community. They live a simple life with the passing years marked by the arrival of the couple's three girls. Franz is called up for basic training in the German army and is away from his beloved wife and children for months. Eventually, when France surrenders and it seems the war might end soon, he is sent back from training.

With his mother and sister-in-law Resie, he and his wife farm the land and raise their children amid the mountains and valleys of upper Austria, cutting hay and gathering. As the war goes on, Jägerstätter and the other able-bodied men in the village are called up to fight. Their first requirement is to swear an oath of allegiance to Adolf Hitler and the Third Reich. Despite pressure from the mayor and his neighbors, who increasingly ostracize him and his family, and from the Bishop of Linz, Jägerstätter refuses. Wrestling with the knowledge that his decision will mean arrest and even death, he finds strength in his faith in God, his prayers, and Fani's love and support. He is taken to prison, first in Enns, then in Berlin and waits months for his trial. During his time in prison, he and Fani write letters to each other and give each other strength. Fani and their daughters are victims of growing hostility in the village over her husband's decision not to fight. Fani is eventually able to visit her husband in Berlin.

After months of brutal incarceration, Jägerstätter's case goes to trial. He is found guilty and sentenced to death. Despite many opportunities to sign the oath of allegiance, and the promise of non-combatant work, he continues to refuse and is executed by the Third Reich on August 9, 1943, while his wife and daughters survive.

Cast

Production

Development
On June 23, 2016, reports emerged that the film, then titled Radegund, would depict the life of Austria’s Franz Jägerstätter, a conscientious objector during World War II who was put to death at age 36 for undermining military actions, and was later declared a martyr and beatified by the Catholic Church. It was announced that August Diehl was set to play Jägerstätter and Valerie Pachner to play his wife, Franziska Jägerstätter. Jörg Widmer was appointed as the director of photography, having worked in all of Malick's films since The New World (2005) as a camera operator.

Writing
Malick said A Hidden Life would have a more structured narrative than his previous works: "Lately—I keep insisting, only very lately—have I been working without a script and I've lately repented the idea. The last picture we shot, and we're now cutting, went back to a script that was very well ordered." This makes it his first linear, plot-driven film since 2005's The New World. He added, "There’s a lot of strain when working without a script because you can lose track of where you are. It’s very hard to coordinate with others who are working on the film. Production designers and location managers arrive in the morning and don’t know what we’re going to shoot or where we’re going to shoot. The reason we did it was to try and get moments that are spontaneous and free. As a movie director, you always feel with a script that you’re trying to fit a square peg into a round hole. And with no script, there’s no round hole, there’s just air. But I’m backing away from that style now."

Malick obtained rights to the book Franz Jägerstätter: Letters and Writings from Prison, edited by Erna Putz, for the film.

Filming

The film began production in Studio Babelsberg in Potsdam, Germany in summer 2016. From 11 July to 19 August 2016 the production shot on location in South Tyrol. Locations there were the church of St. Valentin in Seis am Schlern, the valley of Gsies, the village of Rodeneck, the mills in Terenten, the meadows of Albions in Lajen, the Seiser Alm, the Taufers Castle, the Fane Alm in Mühlbach, the Puez-Geisler Nature Park, the renaissance Velthurns Castle in the village of Feldthurns, the Franzensfeste Fortress, the gardens of the bishop's Hofburg in Brixen and the Neustift cloister.

In August 2016, reports emerged that some of the film's scenes were shot in the small Italian mountain village of Sappada.

Post-production
Actor Franz Rogowski said in a March 2019 interview that no one knew how the film would turn out or when it would be released, considering that it had been in post-production for more than two years at that point. Rogowski added that Malick is "a director who creates spaces rather than produces scenes; his editing style is like that."

Music
The film's score is by James Newton Howard and features violinist James Ehnes, who also performed Howard's violin concerto released in 2018. It was released by Sony Classical Records on December 6, 2019. Of the score, Howard said, "It is a spiritual-sounding score... Terry often spoke about the suffering inherent in love, and you feel yearning, suffering and love in that piece". The score features 40 minutes of original score mixed with selected classical works by Bach, Handel, Dvořák, Górecki, Pärt and others. It was recorded at Abbey Road Studios in London in one day in June 2018 with a 40-piece string section conducted by Pete Anthony with Shawn Murphy as score mixer.

Not listed
 Henryk Górecki Symphony No. 3, Op. 36 – Lento-Cantabile

Release
A Hidden Life premiered in competition at the 72nd Cannes Film Festival on May 19, 2019. The next day, it was acquired by Fox Searchlight Pictures for $12–14 million. The film screened at the Vatican Film Library on December 4, 2019, with Malick making a rare public appearance to introduce the film. It was released in limited release in the U.S. on December 13, 2019, followed by a wide release in January.

Reception
The site's critical consensus reads, "Ambitious and visually absorbing, A Hidden Life may prove inscrutable to non-devotees—but for viewers on Malick's wavelength, it should only further confirm his genius." On Metacritic, the film has a weighted average score of 78 out of 100, based on 43 critics, indicating "generally favorable reviews."

Peter DeBruge of Variety writes: "Whether or not he is specifically referring to the present day, its demagogues, and the way certain evangelicals have once again sold out their core values for political advantage, A Hidden Life feels stunningly relevant as it thrusts this problem into the light." Jägerstätter biographer Erna Putz was touched by the film's spirituality after a private screening in June 2019, saying that Malick had made an "independent and universal work". She also considered Diehl's and Pachner's performances to be accurate to who Franz and Franziska were ("Franz, as I know him from the letters, and Franziska, as I know from encounters").

Accolades

References

External links

 

2019 films
2019 independent films
2010s prison drama films
American prison drama films
Cultural depictions of Austrian men
Films about farmers
Films directed by Terrence Malick
Films scored by James Newton Howard
Films produced by Grant Hill (producer)
Films set in 1939
Films set in 1941
Films set in 1943
Films set in Austria
Films set in Berlin
Fox Searchlight Pictures films
English-language German films
German drama films
World War II films based on actual events
Films about anti-fascism
Films about Catholicism
Films about Christianity
Anti-war films about World War II
Anti-war films
2019 drama films
2010s American films
2010s German films
Films about Austrian resistance
Epic films